Matt Kennedy is a retired American soccer goalkeeper who played in the North American Soccer League, American Soccer League and Major Indoor Soccer League.

In 1979, Kennedy signed with the Philadelphia Fury of the North American Soccer League, but saw no game time before being released.  He then played for the Philadelphia Fever of the Major Indoor Soccer League from 1979 to 1981.  In 1983, he played for the Carolina Lightnin' in the American Soccer League.  He was the league's second leading goalkeeper.  In 1984, he signed with the Minnesota Strikers of the MISL but suffered what first appeared to be a career-ending knee injury during the pre-seasons  He played only two games over the next two years, but became a regular starter during the 1986–1987 season.  On July 15, 1987, Kennedy signed as a free agent with the Wichita Wings.

Kennedy is currently a coach with Vision Soccer Academy in Waukee, Iowa. He is also the head coach of Hoover High School. Before moving to Iowa to help start Iowa United Soccer Club, he was a founding member of the Bangu Soccer Club of Minneapolis.

References

External links
 NASL/MISL stats

1958 births
Living people
American soccer players
American Soccer League (1933–1983) players
Association football goalkeepers
Carolina Lightnin' players
Major Indoor Soccer League (1978–1992) players
Minnesota Strikers (MISL) players
North American Soccer League (1968–1984) players
Philadelphia Fever (MISL) players
Philadelphia Fury (1978–1980) players
Wichita Wings (MISL) players
People from Bucks County, Pennsylvania
People from Waukee, Iowa